James M. Cummings (born in South Boston, Massachusetts) was the sheriff of Barnstable County, Massachusetts.

Early life
Cummings served in the United States Navy. He graduated with a BS from Northeastern University and a Masters in Criminal Justice from Anna Maria College. He began his career in law enforcement in 1974.

References

External links
Biographical page

Living people
Anna Maria College alumni
Northeastern University alumni
Massachusetts sheriffs
United States Navy sailors
People from South Boston
Year of birth missing (living people)
Massachusetts Republicans